Kim's Convenience by Ins Choi, is a play about a family-run Korean-owned convenience store in Toronto's Regent Park neighbourhood.

It debuted on July 6, 2011 at the Toronto Fringe Festival, having secured a slot by winning the Festival's New Play Contest.  The play sold out its seven show run at the 200 seat Bathurst Street Theatre and won the Patron's Pick award that granted them an additional eighth show, which sold out in three hours.  Choi also directed and played the role of Jung.

In 2012, Kim's Convenience was remounted by Soulpepper Theatre, under the direction of Weyni Mengesha, and became the most commercially successful production in the company's entire history. That production won two Toronto Theatre Critics awards in 2012, for Best Actor in a Play for Paul Sun-Hyung Lee and Best Canadian Play. It was a nominee for the Dora Mavor Moore Award for Outstanding New Play in 2012.

The script was published by House of Anansi Press in 2012, and the play toured Canada from 2013 to 2016. In 2017, the show was performed Off-Broadway at the Pershing Square Signature Center as part of a month-long residency of Soulpepper productions.

In March 2015, CBC Television announced that a television series based on the play, also titled Kim's Convenience, was in development. Billed as the first Canadian TV show to feature an Asian cast of lead actors, Kim's Convenience was celebrated as an achievement in diversity in TV programming. The first season of the series was filmed from June to August 2016, and produced by Thunderbird Films and Toronto's Soulpepper Theatre Company. It was broadcast in 13 half-hour episodes on CBC Television in the fall of 2016 and went on to run for five seasons, concluding in April 2021.

Background 
Many Koreans immigrated to Canada in the 1960s to create a better future for their families. A large percentage settled in Toronto and opened convenience stores as a means of business. Ins Choi’s family were amongst the Korean natives who resided in Scarborough, Toronto. His father worked at his uncle’s convenience store called Kim’s Grocer, and Ins worked at his parents’ friends convenience store after school.

The idea that became the play Kim’s Convenience was from a simple conversation Choi was having with a friend. As a member of Fu-GEN Asian Canadian Theatre Company’s play writing unit, he started writing the play partially based on the memories he had from Kim’s Grocer and on his experience working in other convenience stores. The Korean church assisted Choi by contributing $3,000 to help him complete the play. Kim’s Convenience was focused on the Korean natives who opened convenience stores in the 1980s in Toronto and the cultural differences between the parents and their Canadian-born children. Religion and family business is what guided Choi to write the play.

Choi says his main message in the play is for his audience to understand and respect the family-operated stores. He calls Kim’s Convenience his “love letter to [his] parents and to all first-generation immigrants who call Canada their home”. After five years, Choi completed the play and sent it to all the major theatre companies in Toronto but received multiple rejections. He later produced the play at the Toronto Fringe Festival, where it became recognized. Kim’s Convenience is led by an all Asian cast. In 2016, the play turned into the first Canadian TV show that was led by an all Asian cast as well.

Synopsis
Mr. Kim (Appa) owns and runs his own business, Kim’s Convenience, in Toronto's Regent Park neighbourhood, with his wife Mrs. Kim (Umma). Mr. Kim hopes the store will provide a future for his daughter, Janet, whom he hopes will take over the store from him when he retires; however, Janet has no interest in running the store and wishes to have a career as a photographer. Regent Park is being gentrified with new condos and developments and the potential of a Wal-Mart opening up and destroying Mr. Kim's business. Realtor Mr. Lee offers to purchase the store and property. The Kims' son, Jung, ran away from home when he was 16 after Appa had hit him and he was hospitalized for a few days. After Jung was released, everything seemed to be back to normal until one day, Appa went to get the money from the safe and it was empty and so was Jung's room. Since then, Appa hasn't spoken to Jung, though Umma maintains surreptitious contact with him by meeting him at the church. It is not until the prodigal son returns and reconciles with his father that the future of Kim's Convenience is assured.

Critical review

The New York Times's Jesse Green’s feelings towards “Mr. Kim’s Convenience” were mixed. He mentioned that an audience were supposed to enjoy and liked it, because it was relatable and the play was “likeable.” Green said that the play was a bit sitcom but it felt real for him. He felt like the play was a little predictable but it was relatable in the end. As he was watching the play he realized that it was also his story too.
Brad Wheeler said that the play has received several accolades for being authentic, funny and groundbreaking. He loves that it is the first of its kind featuring a Korean Canadian family. Although trying their best to seem like a modern family, fully inducted to the new Canadian culture, this is not the truth in real sense.  Even though the comedy took over most of the play, the play seeks to open a discussion on sensitive topics that are rarely discussed centered on family.

Original cast

Toronto Fringe Festival - July 2011 
Directed by Ins Choi. Performed at the Bathurst Street Theatre.

Appa – Paul Sun-Hyung Lee
Umma – Jean Yoon
Janet – Esther Jun 
Jung – Ins Choi
Rich, Mike, Alex, Mr. Lee – André Sills

Soulpepper Theatre Production - January 2012 / National Tour - 2013 
Directed by Weyni Mengesha. Soulpepper production performed at the Young Centre for the Performing Arts. 
Appa – Paul Sun-Hyung Lee
Umma – Jean Yoon
Janet – Esther Jun (Soulpepper, Calgary production of National Tour), Grace Lynn Kung (National Tour)
Jung – Ins Choi
Rich, Mike, Alex, Mr. Lee – Clé Bennett (Soulpepper), André Sills (National Tour)

Off-Broadway cast - July 2017
Directed by Weyni Mengesha.
Appa – Paul Sun-Hyung Lee
Umma – Jean Yoon
Janet – Rosie Simon 
Jung – Ins Choi
Rich, Mike, Alex, Mr. Lee – Ronnie Rowe Jr.

References

External links
Kim's Convenience at the Soulpepper website

Canadian plays
2011 plays
House of Anansi Press books
Off-Broadway plays
Plays adapted into television shows
Plays set in Canada
Korean-Canadian culture
Immigration in fiction
Asian-Canadian literature